Nicolai Frimodt Vallys (born 4 September 1996) is a Danish professional footballer who plays as a winger for Brøndby IF.

Career

Early years
Vallys grew up in the Østerbro district of Copenhagen. He started playing football at BK Skjold, where he made his senior debut in 2015 in the sixth-tier Copenhagen Series. 

He soon moved to Skovshoved IF, who competed in the third-tier 2nd Division. A midfielder, Vallys made an impact by scoring 12 goals in 30 appearances for Skovshoved, after which FC Roskilde signed him to a two-year deal in June 2018. He continued impressing, this time in the second-tier 1st Division, by scoring seven goals in 29 league appearances.

Silkeborg
On 1 July 2019, Vallys signed a two-year contract with newly promoted Superliga club Silkeborg IF, continuing his rapid rise through the Danish divisions. He made his debut for the club, as well as his debut in the highest Danish division, on 14 July 2019 in a 3–0 away loss to Brøndby IF, coming on as a substitute in the 72nd minute for Marc Rochester Sørensen. He finished his first season with Silkeborg with 34 total appearances in which he scored six goals, as the club suffered relegation to the 1st Division.

During the summer of 2020, he suffered an injury while training with a friend, sidelining him for 2–3 months. On 1 September 2020, he signed a contract extension with Silkeborg until December 2023. He returned to the pitch in October 2020, and played a key role as Silkeborg won promotion back to the Superliga in May 2021.

Brøndby
On 31 August 2022, it was confirmed that Vallys had joined Brøndby IF on a deal until June 2026. Brøndby reportedly paid DKK 22.5 million (€3 million). The move was regarded as controversial by some Brøndby supporters, as he had supported bitter rivals FC Copenhagen as a youth and hails from their home district of Østerbro. After Vallys' received threatening messages, director of sports Carsten V. Jensen, head coach Niels Frederiksen, and club captain Andreas Maxsø publicly criticised some fans' behaviour regarding the transfer.

Vallys made his competitive debut for Brøndby on 4 September in a 2–0 league win away against AC Horsens at CASA Arena. He scored his first goal for the club in the following league game against Randers FC, his home debut at Brøndby Stadium, slotting home the 2–1 lead in a eventual 2–2 draw. On 19 February 2023, Vallys scored a hat-trick in Brøndby's spring opener against Horsens, which ended in a 5–2 victory.

Career statistics

Honours
Individual
 Tipsbladet Player of the Spring: 2022
 Tipsbladet Team of the Season: 2022

References

External links
 
 

Living people
1996 births
Footballers from Copenhagen
Association football midfielders
Danish men's footballers
BK Skjold players
Skovshoved IF players
FC Roskilde players
Silkeborg IF players
Brøndby IF players
Danish Superliga players
Danish 1st Division players
Danish 2nd Division players
Denmark Series players